Dorcadion pararufipenne is a species of beetle in the family Cerambycidae. It was described by Walter Braun in 1976. It is known from Turkey.

Subspecies
 Dorcadion pararufipenne pararufipenne Braun, 1976
 Dorcadion pararufipenne rassei Braun, 1976

References

pararufipenne
Beetles described in 1976